Arthur Cooper (1895–unknown) was an English footballer who played in the Football League for Barnsley and Oldham Athletic.

References

1895 births

Year of death missing

English footballers

Association football goalkeepers
English Football League players
Birmingham City F.C. players
Barnsley F.C. players
Oldham Athletic A.F.C. players